"Tell Me a Riddle" is a short story by Tillie Olsen. It was published in 1961 as the title story of a collection of four Olsen short stories.

Reception
The short story "Tell Me a Riddle" has been called "a powerful study of the politics of voice", "an American Classic", and described as "beautifully crafted and painfully real in the issues of family that it raises".
It received the 1961 O. Henry Award.

Adaptations
Tell Me a Riddle, a film based on the short story collection, was released in 1980.

References

External links
Tell Me a Riddle study guide
Tillie Olsen's 'Tell Me a Riddle': The Catastrophe of History
"No one's private ground": A Bakhtinian reading of Tillie Olsen's Tell Me a Riddle

1956 short stories
1961 short story collections
American short stories
American short story collections
Feminism and the family
Short stories adapted into films